Sophie Desmarais (born July 24, 1986 in Montreal, Quebec) is a Canadian actress, best known for her role in the 2013 film Sarah Prefers to Run, written and directed by Chloé Robichaud.

Career
Desmarais began her career with a small roles in John Duigan's Head in the Clouds in 2004.

In 2010 she had a small role in Heartbeats, directed by Xavier Dolan, followed by Benoît Pilon's Trash (Décharge) in 2011.

In 2013 she played the lead role in Sarah Prefers to Run which went on to play in the Un Certain Regard section at the 2013 Cannes Film Festival. The following year, she appeared in Julie Hivon's film What Are We Doing Here? (Qu'est-ce qu'on fait ici ?).

She was named a Rising Star at the 2014 Toronto International Film Festival.

She played the lead in the 2014 movie Hunting the Northern Godard (La Chasse au Godard d'Abbittibbi).

In 2018 and 2019, she had a key role in the Montreal-based TV series Can You Hear Me, shown on Netflix in 190 countries.

She played the lead in the 2019 Australian feature film Don't Read This on a Plane, acting opposite Saverio Fabbri among others.

In 2022 she appeared in Michel Kandinsky's film The Switch (La Switch).

References

External links

1986 births
Living people
Actresses from Montreal
Canadian film actresses
Canadian television actresses
French Quebecers
21st-century Canadian actresses